Barnett Michael Clinedinst (December 1835 – December 21, 1900) was an American photographer and inventor. He invented the viewfinder and the mirror-and-prism "reflex" arrangement for which the single-lens reflex camera is named.

He was born around December 1835 or 1837 in Woodstock, Virginia. He was a bugler during the American Civil War for Stonewall Jackson.

He died on December 28, 1900, in Washington, D.C. He was the father of Barnett McFee Clinedinst, who served as official White House portrait photographer for the Presidential administrations of Theodore Roosevelt, William Howard Taft, and Woodrow Wilson, and Benjamin West Clinedinst, a painter.

References

Notes

American photographers
19th-century American inventors
1900 deaths
People from Shenandoah County, Virginia
1835 births